Nałęcz may refer to:

 Nałęcz, Kuyavian-Pomeranian Voivodeship, a village in north-central Poland
 Tomasz Nałęcz, Polish politician and academic
 Nałęcz coat-of-arms